On 9 December 2019, Whakaari / White Island, an active stratovolcano island in New Zealand's northeastern Bay of Plenty region, explosively erupted. The island was a popular tourist destination, known for its volcanic activity, and 47 people were on the island at the time. Twenty-two people died, either in the explosion or from injuries sustained, including two whose bodies were never found and were later declared dead. A further 25 people suffered injuries, with the majority needing intensive care for severe burns. Continuing seismic and volcanic activity together with heavy rainfall, low visibility and the presence of toxic gases, hampered recovery efforts over the week following the incident.

Experts identified the event as a phreatic eruption: a release of steam and volcanic gases that caused an explosion, launching rock and ash into the air.

Following the eruption, investigations resulted in WorkSafe New Zealand charging multiple tour operators as well as government and scientific agencies under the Health and Safety at Work Act 2015 for failing to ensure the health and safety of workers and others. The latest hearing was held in June 2021.

Background

The volcano has erupted many times in recent history, including several times in the 1980s. A major eruption formed a new crater in 2000, and small eruptions occurred in 2012, 2013, and 2016.

The volcano had been showing signs of unrest for several weeks before the 2019 eruption. In October 2019, volcanic tremors and sulphur dioxide gas were at their highest levels since 2016, indicating that an eruption was more likely to occur, and on 18 November, the volcano was rated at Volcanic Alert Level 2, indicating "moderate to heightened volcanic unrest", due to increased activity.

Seismic activity can be a contributing factor to hydrothermic eruptions, due to a reduction of pressure within the geothermal system.

The island is monitored by GNS Science with three web cameras, one seismograph, and a microphone to detect volcanic explosions. The organisation also makes regular visits to test water, gas and soil, and to survey surface deformation.

Tourists regularly visited the island, primarily through White Island Tours. The organisation posted a statement on their web page before the eruption, which stated:

Eruption

The volcano erupted on 9 December 2019 at 14:11 NZDT (01:11 UTC). The ash plume rose  into the air.

It was initially believed that there were about 100 tourists on or near to the island when the eruption took place; later, this figure was revised to 47 people who were on the island at the time. Of these people, 38 were passengers on a shore excursion from the cruise ship Ovation of the Seas, which was on a 12-day voyage around New Zealand and had berthed at the Port of Tauranga that morning.

Some visitors were waiting for vessels to take them off the island at the time of the eruption. Tour operators and these vessels rescued 23 people from the island before it was officially declared unsafe. A passenger on one of the boats stated that his vessel attempted to first outrun the ash cloud before many on the vessel noticed a crowd of people in need of help on the jetty. Those who were brought onto the boat were aided by the original passengers who used water bottles, jackets and other clothing, inhalers, and eye drops.

Another passenger told reporters that the boat he was on, which was about 200 metres offshore at the time of the eruption, launched an emergency inflatable and retrieved 23 people before returning to the mainland. Paramedics from the New Zealand Coastguard boarded the boat before it reached the docks to tend the injured.

Noticing the eruption from the mainland shore, three commercial helicopter pilots conducted rescue missions to the island in their helicopters, bringing back twelve survivors. They also saw several bodies in the area, but concentrated on bringing back the survivors. The pilots reportedly attempted to return to the island to collect the bodies they had seen but were stopped by police; however, they were consulted later in order to collect the bodies once the area became more stable.

Casualties

The 47 people on the island at the time of the eruption consisted of 24 Australians, 9 Americans, 5 New Zealanders, 4 Germans, 2 Chinese, 2 Britons and 1 Malaysian. A passenger on a rescue boat stated that many of the injured had severe burns as many of them had worn just T-shirts and shorts for the day.

At 18:35 on 9 December, media were told there was one confirmed fatality, with more likely to be dead as several were missing, while many were injured, seven critically. Authorities said it was still too dangerous for the emergency services to get onto the island to rescue people as it is covered in ash and volcanic material. Later the same day, officials declared that forty-seven people were on the island at the moment of the eruption: five were killed, 34 injured and rescued, while eight were missing and presumed dead.

Three other people died in hospital the next days, bringing the confirmed death toll to eight. Six more bodies were found during an operation on the island, bringing the death toll to 14. On 14 December, it was announced that the death toll had risen to 15 as another injured person died in hospital. A day later, an Australian citizen who was repatriated died in hospital, bringing the death toll to 16, plus two victims whose bodies had not been recovered. Another victim died from injuries in hospital, pushing the death toll to 19 including two missing people that were presumed dead. A further victim died at a hospital in Australia on 12 January 2020 bringing the total to 20. Authorities were still working to recover two more bodies, but efforts were scaled down from 15 January.

Fatalities
Over the days following the initial eruption, the death toll steadily rose as bodies were recovered from the island and as several of the severely burnt victims succumbed to their injuries. On 15 December, it was announced that the death toll had risen to 16. Including two people who were missing and later considered fatalities, there were 13 Australian tourists, three Americans and two New Zealand men who worked as guides for White Island Tours. Another victim, an American woman, succumbed to her injuries on 22 December, raising the confirmed death toll to 19 and the number of the American fatalities to four. In January 2020, an Australian man and an American man died of their injuries and the two missing people were officially declared as dead, bringing the death toll to 21. A German man died on 2 July 2020, bringing the death toll to 22.

Due to the severe injuries sustained by those on the island, identification of the deceased was carried out by a variety of individuals including a pathologist, a forensic dentist, and a fingerprint officer. This was aided by officers creating profiles of the victims, including descriptions of appearance, clothing, photos, fingerprints, medical and dental records, and DNA samples. The information was then matched to evidence gathered from the deceased individual in the autopsy.

Injuries
All but three of the survivors suffered severe or critical injuries and the vast majority were badly burned. They were initially taken to Whakatāne Hospital, where they were triaged and stabilised before being transferred to other hospitals. Whakatāne Hospital, Tauranga Hospital, and Waikato Hospital in Hamilton all activated their mass casualty plans. On 10 December, the Ministry of Health announced that twenty-five people had been transferred to the country's four burns units in Auckland (Middlemore), Hamilton, Lower Hutt, and Christchurch, all of which were at capacity. On 11 December, it was reported that New Zealand had ordered 1.2 million cm2 of skin from the United States and Australia to treat patients following the eruption, some of whom had burns on up to 95% of their bodies. Three survivors suffered slight injuries.

Thirteen injured Australians were airlifted to Australia from the night of 11 December to receive treatment in hospitals in Sydney and Melbourne. Three Royal Australian Air Force (RAAF) planes, a C-130J Super Hercules and two C-17 Globemasters, flew to Christchurch with specialist aircrew and medical equipment on board. Several Australian state governments also supplied aircraft to assist in the airlift. A total of twelve Australians were expected to be airlifted to their homeland.

Missing after eruption
Initially, rescuers focused their efforts on people who were still alive and left the deceased on the island. Consequently, many people were listed as missing until their bodies were recovered and formally identified. On 15 December, authorities said the bodies of two victims had not been found and may have been swept into the sea. Police believe their bodies were initially near a stream, and were swept down the stream during a "significant weather event" on the night of 9 December. On 23 January, the coroner declared the missing two to be dead.

Aftermath
Directly after the eruption, the volcanic alert level for the island was raised to 4, but was decreased by 16:30 on the same day to level 3. No further eruptive activity occurred, and on 12 December the volcanic alert level was lowered to 2, signifying "moderate to heightened volcanic unrest." Volcanic tremor increased in the aftermath of the eruption, with small scale gas jetting and steam bursts observed on 13 December, however, the volcanic tremor level dropped that evening.

Ovation of the Seas postponed its departure from Tauranga until the morning of 11 December as police collected DNA samples from the cabins of the missing passengers. Māori townspeople and members of the Ovation of the Seas passengers and crew held a moment of silence honouring the ship's passengers and other victims. Later a representative of the Māori began a karakia tau te mauri, a traditional blessing to settle the spirit before the ship left. The ship returned to Sydney on 16 December on an altered itinerary via Wellington and Picton. All passengers received the equivalent of one day's fare in on-board credit as compensation.

All those injured and killed in the eruption, regardless of nationality, would be covered by the Accident Compensation Corporation (ACC), who administer New Zealand's no-fault accident compensation scheme. The ACC Act generally prevents claims for damages for negligent acts in New Zealand, but it may be possible for the cruise ship passengers to sue in American courts under United States maritime law.

On 6 December 2020, Radio New Zealand reported that more than 89,000 people had signed a petition to stop the prosecution of helicopter pilots from Kahu Helicopters, Volcanic Air and Aerius who had saved lives during the eruption. In addition, the Association of Scientists has warned that the prosecution of Crown research institutions like GNS Science could have the effect of muting the scientific community and preventing the sharing of vital information during a crisis.

In December 2022, a group of about 20 people which included family members of victims, survivors and first responders returned to the island in order to place a memorial plaque to honour the 22 deceased victims. While the group was photographed without any safety equipment, they reportedly had worked with authorities and cultural advisors to travel to the island in order to place the plaque. Another ceremony was in New Zealand that month to honour the victims after being unable to in previous years due to COVID-19 restrictions.

Legal 
In December 2019, the New Zealand Police launched an investigation into the disaster in conjunction with WorkSafe New Zealand.

On 30 November 2020, it was reported that WorkSafe New Zealand had filed charges against 13 parties over tours to the island, including its owners, the Buttle family (who own the island through Whakaari Management Ltd), GNS Science, the National Emergency Management Agency (New Zealand), and tour operators Volcanic Air and the Ngāti Awa–owned White Island Tours. Ten parties have been charged under the Health and Safety at Work Act 2015; nine under Section 36 for failing to ensure the health and safety of workers and others, with one facing a charge as a person controlling a business. Each of these charges carries a maximum fine of NZ$1.5 million. Three individuals were also charged under Section 44 of the act which requires directors or individuals who have influence over a company to ensure that the company meets health and safety obligations. Each charge carries a maximum fine of NZ$300,000.

At a court hearing on 5 March 2021 the names of all the charged were officially revealed. Ten organisations and three individuals were charged under the Health and Safety at Work Act. The ten organisations were seven tourism companies (White Island Tours Limited; Volcanic Air Safaris Limited; Aerius Limited; Kahu NZ Limited; Inflite Charters Limited; I D Tours New Zealand Limited; and Tauranga Tourism Services Limited), GNS Science, the National Emergency Management Agency and Whakaari Management Ltd. The three individuals were Andrew, James and Peter Buttle, directors of Whakaari Management. A number of the charges were for alleged offences between April 2016 and December 2019. None of the charges relate to events following the eruption, when some of the charged parties rescued people from the island. On 26 August 2021, the 13 defendants pleaded not guilty to charges of health and safety breaches.

On 31 March 2022, the flight operator Inflite pleaded guilty to the health and safety charges, and was ordered to pay fines of $227,500 and costs of prosecution of $40,000.

On 4 May 2022, the National Emergency Management Agency successfully appealed for a dismissal of the charges against it in relation to the Whakaari eruption. NEMA's lawyer Victoria Casey QC claimed that the application of section 36(2) of the Health and Safety at Work Act 2015 would lead to "absurd outcomes". Judge Evangelos Thomas of the Auckland District Court ruled in favour of the defendant. The charge against GNS Science relating to how it communicated volcanic risk to the public was dropped in October 2022.

On 31 May 2022, the Buttle family, who own Whakaari / White Island, announced that they were applying to the court to have the charges against them dismissed.

Trials for the remaining charges are due to be heard in the court over four months commencing in July 2023.

Civil lawsuits 
In April 2020 legal action was commenced in Australia on behalf of relatives and Ovation passengers against the cruise-ship operator Royal Caribbean International.

Several injured tourists filed lawsuits against the cruise liner Royal Caribbean and the New Zealand–based tour company ID Tours in the United States and Australia. American couple Lauren Barham and Matthew Urey filed a lawsuit against Royal Caribbean, ID Tours, and White Island Tours for negligence at the United States District Court of the Southern District of Florida, claiming that the defendants had ample warning that the volcano was on the brink of eruption but had failed to warn passengers who had signed up for the crater excursion.

Depiction in media
The eruption and the experiences of those on the island have been depicted in various media formats, with the majority being filmed interviews and documentaries about tourists' personal experiences. The eruption was also heavily documented by day trippers and other individuals on boats surrounding the island, along with at least one member of the tour groups who took a photo of the start of the eruption with her phone. One survivor, Stephanie Browitt, began using the social media platform TikTok to document her experiences on the island along with her immediate and continued recovery, as well as pay tribute to her father and sister, who died in the eruption. She wore compression garments and took them off in 2022.

The scientific response to the eruption and the recovery mission was highlighted in a documentary. A documentary titled The Eruption; Stories of Survival was released in December 2020 and documents the eruption through survivors' accounts and interviews with family members of those who died in the eruption. In December 2022, Netflix released The Volcano: Rescue from Whakaari and used first person accounts along with footage of the eruption and its aftermath, to document the time leading up to, during and after the eruption.

Survivor accounts were also highlighted in an episode of 60 Minutes Australia, in which some survivors made accusations of inaction towards rescue efforts which potentially caused needless deaths. Similar remarks were made in a Four Corners documentary. In an interview with 60 Minutes, a medical director, Tony Smith, remarked that authorities could have reached the island much sooner, but that "the information we were receiving at that time was that it was unsafe to land on the island." However, Smith also expressed doubt that much more lives could have been saved even if they had landed on the island sooner.

Responses
Ray Cas, a professor emeritus from Monash University, and past president of the International Association for Volcanology and Chemistry of the Earth's Interior, published comments about the disaster through the Australian Science Media Centre, claiming that the incident was "a disaster waiting to happen". He felt that the island was too dangerous to allow the daily tour groups that visited.

Prime Minister Jacinda Ardern said that "the scale of this tragedy is devastating". On 10 December, Ardern met emergency services personnel who responded to the incident. The local member of Parliament Anne Tolley stated that the town of Whakatāne was shattered by the disaster and their thoughts were with the victims and their families but did not rule out that the tours would continue due to the disaster occurring. Tolley claimed the tours were "iconic" and a "centrepiece of the town's tourism".

Australian Prime Minister Scott Morrison stated that "This is a very, very hard day for many families whose loved ones have been caught up in this terrible, terrible tragedy" and announced that an Australian Federal Police forensic team was sent to New Zealand to assist. The Australian Parliament House also lowered its flags at half-mast.

See also
 
 
  – similar phreatic eruption with fatalities

Notes

References

External links
 Detailed multimedia coverage of the eruption and casualties by Stuff

2019 natural disasters
21st-century volcanic events
December 2019 events in New Zealand
Volcanic eruptions in New Zealand
Phreatic eruptions
VEI-2 eruptions